Sweet Daddies is a 1926 American silent comedy crime film directed by Alfred Santell and starring George Sidney, Charles Murray, and Vera Gordon. The film foregrounds positive relationships between Jewish and Irish American characters, despite the presence of some stereotypes.

The plot revolves around comedic mishaps in the bootleg liquor business. The romance between the daughter of the Jewish Finkelstein family and the son of the Irish O’Brien family ends happily.

Cast
 George Sidney as Abie Finklebaum 
 Charles Murray as Patrick O'Brien 
 Vera Gordon as Rose Finklebaum
 Jobyna Ralston as Mariam Finklebaum 
 Jack Mulhall as Jimmy O'Brien 
 Gaston Glass as Sam Berkowitz 
 Aggie Herring as Mrs. O'Brien

Reception
The New York Times film critic described it thus:

Impact
Sidney and Murray, who portrayed the fathers of the two families, would go on to work together in many  films that, focusing on Jewish and Irish relations, were often described as “ethnic comedies.”

Jobyna Robson (Mariam Finkelstein) would go on to be regarded as a great silent film comedian.  Arthur Edeson became a major cinematographer.

References

Bibliography
 Erens, Patricia. The Jew in American Cinema. Indiana University Press, 1984.

External links

1926 films
1920s crime comedy films
American crime comedy films
American silent feature films
1920s English-language films
First National Pictures films
Films directed by Alfred Santell
American black-and-white films
1926 comedy films
1920s American films
Silent American comedy films
Silent crime comedy films